Sankt Josef is a municipality in the district of Deutschlandsberg in the state of Styria in southeast Austria.

Population

References

External links 
 www.st-josef.steiermark.at/ - city website

Cities and towns in Deutschlandsberg District